The 2015 Dwars door Vlaanderen was the 70th edition of the Dwars door Vlaanderen cycling one-day classic, which took place on 25 March 2015 and was rated as a 1.HC event as part of the 2015 UCI Europe Tour. It was organised as part of the Flanders Classics organisation.

The 2014 winner was Niki Terpstra, who won the race in a solo breakaway. He was the favourite for the 2015 race and raced as part of a strong  team in 2015. The team also included world champion Michał Kwiatkowski, former world champion Mark Cavendish and Iljo Keisse. Other favourites included Lars Boom, Stijn Devolder, Gert Steegmans (both ) and former winners Matti Breschel and Oscar Gatto, as well as a large number of other riders. The race was also notable for the presence of Nairo Quintana, racing on the cobblestones for the first time in his career as part of his preparation for cobbled stages in the 2015 Tour de France.

The first part of the race was generally flat, but it became more hilly towards the end of the race. It included 12 major climbs, five of them cobbled, and three flat sections of cobbled roads. The race included several of the climbs used in the Tour of Flanders, which took place the following week, such as the Oude Kwaremont and the Paterberg.

The race was won by Jelle Wallays. He was part of the main breakaway of the day, escaping early on in the race. Wallays attacked, initially alongside Gert Dockx and then alone, and built a lead of nearly a minute. On the Taaienberg, with  remaining, Kwiatkowski, Edward Theuns and Dylan van Baarle attacked from the first chasing group. They quickly caught Wallays and created a lead group of four riders. They built a lead of 40 seconds thanks to Kwiatkowski's efforts on the Oude Kwaremont; Boom attempted to counter-attack, but he crashed into a field. The chase group was unorganised and failed to catch the leading four riders. With  remaining, Wallays made another attack. Since Theuns was Wallays' teammate, Kwiatkowski and van Baarle had the task of catching him. They both looked to the other to do the work to catch Wallays and ended up leading out Theuns to give  the first two positions on the podium. After the race, Kwiatkowski and van Baarle blamed each other for their failure to win the race.

Categorised sections

Climbs

Flat cobbled sections

Results

References

External links 

 

Dwars door Vlaanderen
Dwars door Vlaanderen
Dwars door Vlaanderen
March 2015 sports events in Europe